Urosalpinx cossmanni is an extinct species of sea snail, a marine gastropod mollusk in the family Muricidae, the murex snails or rock snails.

Description

Distribution
Fossils were found in Miocene and Oligocene strata of Argentina (age range: 23.03 to 15.97 Ma).

References

 Ortmann, A. (1900). Synopsis of the Collections of Invertebrate fossils made by the Princeton Expedition to Southern Patagonia. American Journal of Science, series 4, 10: 368-381
 A. Gazdzicki and H. Pugaczewska. 1984. Biota of the "Pecten Conglomerate" (Polenez Cove Formation, Pliocene) of King George Island (South Shetland Islands, Antarctica). Studia Geologica Polonica 79:59-120
 Claudia Julia del Río, Tertiary Marine Molluscan Assemblages of Eastern Patagonia (Argentina): A Biostratigraphic Analysis; Journal of Paleontology Vol. 78, No. 6 (Nov., 2004), pp. 1097-1122

External links
 Image of Urosalpinx cossmanni
 Revue_critique_de_paléozoologie nr. 3, 1901

cossmanni
Gastropods described in 1900
Miocene gastropods
Oligocene gastropods